James Sinclair Dickson (2 March 1884 – 3 January 1961) was an Australian rules footballer for the Port Adelaide Football Club.

Football
Sinclair Dickson was a member of three Port Adelaide premiership teams in the South Australian Football League. He also won the Port Adelaide best and fairest in consecutive years in 1908 and 1909. Sinclair Dickson was runner up for the 1909 Magarey Medal. Dickson represented South Australia on seven occasions between 1908 and 1910.

Sinclair Dickson served as the treasurer of the Port Adelaide Football Club during the 1920s. In 1924 Sinclair Dickson took part in a charity match that pitted retired champions against a league eighteen of mostly current state carnival players with the former side winning. In 1928 Sinclair Dickson was made a life member of the Port Adelaide Football Club.

Outside football 
In the 1930s Sinclair Dickson was the president of the Alberton Bowling Club.

Family
The son of William Dickson, and Helen Dickson, née Sinclair, James Sinclair Dickson was born at Goolwa, South Australia on 2 March 1884.

He married Muriel Mary Playfair (-1928) on 11 October 1910.

See also
 1908 Melbourne Carnival

Footnotes

References
 
 Jubilee of Australian Football: The Inter-State Teams: The South Australian Team, The Leader, (Saturday, 29 August 1908), p.29.
 League Footballers: Port Adelaide, The (Adelaide) Observer, (Saturday, 29 May 1909), p.27.
 Interstate Football: Victoria v. South Australia: South Australian Team, The (Adelaide) Chronicle, (Saturday, 26 June 1909), p.32.
 Interstate Football on the Adelaide Oval: Victoria v. South Australia: South Australian Team, The (Adelaide) Chronicle, (Saturday, 6 August 1910), p.32.

Australian rules footballers from South Australia
Port Adelaide Football Club (SANFL) players
Port Adelaide Football Club players (all competitions)
1880s births
1961 deaths